3190 may refer to:

In general
 A.D. 3190, a year in the 4th millennium CE
 3190 BC, a year in the 4th millennium BCE
 3190, a number in the 3000 (number) range

Other uses
 3190 Aposhanskij, an asteroid in the Asteroid Belt, the 3190th asteroid registered
 Hawaii Route 3190, a state highway
 Louisiana Highway 3190, a state highway
 Texas Farm to Market Road 3190, a state highway

See also